The Seaside at Palavas is an 1854 painting of the beach at Palavas-les-Flots by Gustave Courbet. It was commissioned by Alfred Bruyas during Courbet's first stay at Montpellier. Courbet originated in Franche-Comté and so the landscapes of Languedoc and the Mediterranean were a revelation. The work was also partly inspired by The Monk by the Sea by  Caspar David Friedrich. It is now in the Musée Fabre in Montpellier.

1854 paintings
Paintings by Gustave Courbet
Landscape paintings
Paintings in the collection of the Musée Fabre
Water in art